Amaury Antônio Pasos, also commonly known simply as Amaury (born December 11, 1935) is a retired Brazilian basketball player and coach of Argentine origin. Born in São Paulo, Brazil, he was a 1.91 m (6'3") tall power forward. He competed at three Olympic Games and was named one of FIBA's 50 Greatest Players in 1991. He was awarded with the Brazil Former Athlete Olympic Prize in 2003. He was enshrined into the FIBA Hall of Fame in 2007.

Club career
At the club level, Pasos played for Clube de Regatas Tietê (1951–1961), and then C.R. Sírio (1962–1965), and Corinthians (1966–1972). He won the Brazilian League championship in 1966 and 1969, and the São Paulo regional title league in 1966, 1968, and 1969.

National team career
Pasos played for the senior Brazilian national team. With Brazil, he won the gold medal at the 1959 FIBA World Championship (where he was also named the MVP of the tournament) and the gold medal at the 1963 FIBA World Championship. He also won a silver medal at the 1954 FIBA World Championship, bronze medals at the 1960 Summer Olympics and 1964 Summer Olympics, a bronze medal at the 1967 FIBA World Championship, a silver medal at the 1963 Pan American Games, and a bronze medal at the 1955 Pan American Games.

References

External links
FIBA Hall of Fame Profile
FIBA Profile
CBB Profile 

1935 births
Living people
Basketball players at the 1955 Pan American Games
Basketball players at the 1963 Pan American Games
Basketball players at the 1960 Summer Olympics
Basketball players at the 1964 Summer Olympics
Brazilian men's basketball players
1954 FIBA World Championship players
1959 FIBA World Championship players
1963 FIBA World Championship players
1967 FIBA World Championship players
Brazilian people of Argentine descent
Sportspeople of Argentine descent
Centers (basketball)
Clube Atlético Monte Líbano basketball coaches
Esporte Clube Sírio basketball players
FIBA Hall of Fame inductees
FIBA World Championship-winning players
Medalists at the 1956 Summer Olympics
Medalists at the 1960 Summer Olympics
Medalists at the 1964 Summer Olympics
Olympic basketball players of Brazil
Olympic bronze medalists for Brazil
Olympic medalists in basketball
Pan American Games bronze medalists for Brazil
Pan American Games medalists in basketball
Pan American Games silver medalists for Brazil
Point guards
Power forwards (basketball)
Sport Club Corinthians Paulista basketball players
Basketball players from São Paulo
Medalists at the 1955 Pan American Games